La Garde is a Canadian drama film, directed by Sylvain Archambault and released in 2014.

The film stars Paul Doucet as Luc Bissailon, a father who abducts his son Samuel {Antoine L'Écuyer) after losing custody in his separation from ex-wife Sylvie (Sandrine Bisson. He takes Samuel to a wilderness location on a hunting trip, only for Samuel to be forced to walk back to town to seek medical help after an accident with the gun results in Luc getting shot.

The film opened in theatres on April 4, 2014.

Danielle Huard received a Jutra Award nomination for Best Makeup at the 17th Jutra Awards in 2015.

References

External links

2014 films
2014 drama films
Canadian drama films
Films shot in Quebec
Films set in Quebec
2010s Canadian films
Films directed by Sylvain Archambault